The 2012 Emakumeen Euskal Bira was the 25th edition of the Emakumeen Bira, a women's cycling stage race in Spain. It was rated by the UCI as category 2.1, and was held between 7 and 10 June 2012.

Stages

Stage 1
7 June 2012 – Iurreta to Matiena,

Stage 2
8 June 2012 – Lekeitio – Lekeitio,

Stage 3
9 June 2012 – Orduña to Orduña (individual time trial),

Stage 4
10 June 2012 – Orduña to Iurreta,

Final classifications

General classification

Source:

References

External links

Emakumeen Euskal Bira
Emakumeen Euskal Bira
Emakumeen Euskal Bira